Amjad Hossain (14 August 1942 – 14 December 2018)  was a Bangladeshi film director, actor, scriptwriter and lyricist. He won the  Bangladesh National Film Award for Best Director twice, for the films Golapi Ekhon Traine (1978) and Bhat De (1984). He also won Bangla Academy Literary Award in 2004 and Ekushey Padak in 1992.

Career
Hossain was born in Jamalpur on 14 August 1942.

Hossain debuted his acting career in the film Tomar Amar (1961). He made his directorial debut as an assistant in the film Agun Niye Khela (1967).

Filmography

Personal life
Hossain had two sons -  Sajjad Hossain Dodul and Sohel Arman. Sohel was married to actress Tareen Jahan.

Awards
 Fazlul Haque Memorial Award (2009)
 Uro Shishu Shahitya Puroshkar (2008)
 Bangla Academy Literary Award (2004)
 Ekushey Padak (1992)
 Bangladesh National Film Award 1978, 1979, 1984

References

External links

1942 births
2018 deaths
Bangladeshi film directors
Bangladeshi male film actors
Best Director National Film Award (Bangladesh) winners
Recipients of the Ekushey Padak
Recipients of Bangla Academy Award
Place of birth missing
Best Screenplay National Film Award (Bangladesh) winners
Best Dialogue National Film Award (Bangladesh) winners
Best Lyricist National Film Award (Bangladesh) winners
Best Story National Film Award (Bangladesh) winners